Halbmeil station is a railway station in the municipality of Wolfach, in Baden-Württemberg, Germany. It is located on the Kinzig Valley Railway of Deutsche Bahn.

Services 
 the following services stop at Halbmeil:

References

External links
 
 

Railway stations in Baden-Württemberg
Buildings and structures in Ortenaukreis